Petya Tsekova (born ) is a Bulgarian volleyball player, playing as a right side hitter. She was part of the Bulgaria women's national volleyball team.

She competed at the 2007 Women's European Volleyball Championship, and at the 2009 Women's European Volleyball Championship,

References

External links

1986 births
Living people
Bulgarian women's volleyball players
Place of birth missing (living people)
Opposite hitters